Adavisomapur may refer to places in India:

Adavisomapur, Gadag, a village in Gadag District in the state of Karnataka
Adavisomapur, Haveri, a village in Haveri District in the state of Karnataka